William de Alburwyke was an English medieval singer, college fellow,  and university chancellor.

William de Alburwyke was chantor of York in northern England. He was also at Merton College, Oxford and a Doctor of Divinity. He was Principal of Broadgates Hall, which later became Pembroke College, Oxford. Between 1324 and 1326, he was Chancellor of the University of Oxford.

References

Year of birth unknown
Year of death unknown
People from York
English male singers
Fellows of Merton College, Oxford
Principals of Broadgates Hall, Oxford
Chancellors of the University of Oxford
13th-century English people
14th-century English people
13th-century musicians
14th-century musicians